Marceline is a neighborhood in Pasadena, California, whose central feature is Pasadena City College. It has an area of roughly half a square mile and is bordered by Walnut Street to the north, Orlando Road to the south, Hill Avenue to the west, and Allen Avenue to the east. The neighborhood is named for a short-lived railroad cutoff which ran through the center of the neighborhood at the turn of the 20th century.

Landmarks
The vast majority of commercial activity is centered on the PCC Campus, especially on Colorado Boulevard. There are no parks in the neighborhood, though Marceline borders the Huntington Library.

Transportation
The Metro L Line has a station on Allen Avenue, two blocks from Marceline's edge. Pasadena City College is the eastern terminus of Metro Rapid line 780, and Metro Local lines 180, 267 and 686 run through the neighborhood, as well as Pasadena Transit routes 10 and 60 and Foothill Transit route 187.

Neighborhoods in Pasadena, California